The teams competing in Group 3 of the 2009 UEFA European Under-21 Championships qualifying competition are Bulgaria, England, Montenegro, Portugal, and Republic of Ireland.

Standings

Key:
Pts Points, Pld Matches played, W Won, D Drawn, L Lost, GF Goals for, GA Goals against, GD Goal Difference

Matches

Goalscorers

1 goal
: Valeri Domovchiyski, Atanas Kurdov, Momchil Tsvetanov
: Matthew Derbyshire, Tom Huddlestone, Adam Johnson, Nedum Onuoha, Andrew Surman, Theo Walcott
: Andy Keogh, John-Joe O'Toole 
: Mijuško Bojović, Stevan Jovetić, Goran Vujović, Simon Vukčević  
: Nuno Coelho, Carlos Saleiro, Celestino, Tiago Targino, Ricardo Vaz Tê, Miguel Veloso
Own goals
: Stephen O'Halloran
: Janko Simović
: João Moreira

Group 3
Under
Under
Under
Under